The following is a list of "H" codes for Medical Subject Headings (MeSH), as defined by the United States National Library of Medicine (NLM).

This list continues the information at List of MeSH codes (G14). Codes following these are found at List of MeSH codes (I01). For other MeSH codes, see List of MeSH codes.

The source for this content is the set of 2006 MeSH Trees from the NLM.

– natural sciences

– astronomy
  – Solar System
  – meteoroids
  – minor planets
  – planets
  – Earth (planet)
  – Moon
  – Jupiter
  – Mars
  – Mercury (planet)
  – Neptune
  – Pluto
  – Saturn
  – Uranus
  – Venus
  – Solar activity

– biological sciences
  – anatomy
  –  artistic anatomy
  –  comparative anatomy
  –  cross-sectional anatomy
  – visible human project
  –  regional anatomy
  –  veterinary anatomy
  – cytology
  – embryology
  – teratology
  – histology
  –  comparative histology
  – neuroanatomy
  – biochemistry
  – histocytochemistry
  – immunohistochemistry
  – immunochemistry
  – immunohistochemistry
  – neurochemistry
  – biology
  – botany
  – ethnobotany
  – pharmacognosy
  – computational biology
  – systems biology
  – developmental biology
  – embryology
  – teratology
  – ecology
  – exobiology
  – genetics
  – cytogenetics
  – genetic research
  – human genome project
  –  behavioral genetics
  – genetic determinism
  –  medical genetics
  – eugenics
  – genetic services
  – genetic counseling
  – genetic screening
  –  microbial genetics
  –  population genetics
  – genomics
  – proteomics
  – immunogenetics
  – molecular biology
  –  molecular epidemiology
  – pharmacogenetics
  – toxicogenetics
  – radiation genetics
  – laboratory animal science
  – marine biology
  – microbiology
  – bacteriology
  – environmental microbiology
  – air microbiology
  – food microbiology
  – soil microbiology
  – water microbiology
  – industrial microbiology
  – mycology
  – virology
  – molecular biology
  –  molecular epidemiology
  – natural history
  – neurobiology
  – parasitology
  – food parasitology
  – parasitic sensitivity tests
  – photobiology
  – radiobiology
  – zoology
  – entomology
  – biophysics
  – bionics
  – electrophysiology
  – hemorheology
  – biotechnology
  – biomimetics
  – neurosciences
  – neuroanatomy
  – neurobiology
  – neurochemistry
  – neuroendocrinology
  – neuropharmacology
  – neurophysiology
  – pharmacology
  – ethnopharmacology
  – neuropharmacology
  – pharmacoepidemiology
  – pharmacogenetics
  – toxicogenetics
  – pharmacognosy
  –  clinical pharmacology
  – psychopharmacology
  – toxicology
  – toxicogenetics
  – physiology
  – electrophysiology
  – endocrinology
  – neuroendocrinology
  – neurophysiology
  –  comparative physiology
  – psychophysiology
  – neuropsychology
  – psychoneuroimmunology

– chemistry
  – biochemistry
  – catalysis
  – structure-activity relationship
  – quantitative structure-activity relationship
  –  agricultural chemistry
  – maillard reaction
  –  analytical chemistry
  – electrophoresis
  – immunochemistry
  –  clinical chemistry
  –  inorganic chemistry
  –  bioinorganic chemistry
  –  organic chemistry
  – acylation
  – acetylation
  – aminoacylation
  – transfer rna aminoacylation
  – alkylation
  – methylation
  – dna methylation
  – amination
  – cyclization
  – dealkylation
  – deamination
  – decarboxylation
  – esterification
  – glycosylation
  – hydrogenation
  – hydroxylation
  – isomerism
  – stereoisomerism
  – nitrosation
  – phosphorylation
  –  pharmaceutical chemistry
  – drug design
  – structure-activity relationship
  – quantitative structure-activity relationship
  –  physical chemistry
  – absorption
  – adsorption
  – air ionization
  – anisotropy
  – catalysis
  – colloids
  – micelles
  – corrosion
  – crystallization
  – crystallography
  – neutron diffraction
  – powder diffraction
  – x-ray diffraction
  –  x-ray crystallography
  – desiccation
  – dialysis
  – dimerization
  – electrochemistry
  – conductometry
  – electrolysis
  – electroplating
  – electrophoresis
  –  agar gel electrophoresis
  – comet assay
  –  capillary electrophoresis
  –  cellulose acetate electrophoresis
  – electrophoresis, gel, pulsed-field
  – electrophoresis, gel, two-dimensional
  –  paper electrophoresis
  –  polyacrylamide gel electrophoresis
  –  disc electrophoresis
  – electrophoresis, gel, two-dimensional
  –  starch gel electrophoresis
  – immunoelectrophoresis
  – counterimmunoelectrophoresis
  –  two-dimensional immunoelectrophoresis
  – iontophoresis
  – isoelectric focusing
  – polarography
  – potentiometry
  – energy transfer
  – linear energy transfer
  – filtration
  – micropore filters
  – ultrafiltration
  – hemofiltration
  – hemodiafiltration
  – hydrogen bonding
  – hydrogen-ion concentration
  – acid-base equilibrium
  – isoelectric point
  – hydrolysis
  – hydrophobicity
  – ion exchange
  – maillard reaction
  – molecular structure
  – molecular conformation
  – molecular weight
  – osmolar concentration
  – oxidation-reduction
  – particle size
  – permeability
  – osmosis
  – osmotic pressure
  – phase transition
  – photochemistry
  – photobleaching
  – photolysis
  – photophosphorylation
  – photosynthesis
  – precipitation
  – flocculation
  – fractional precipitation
  – proton-motive force
  – radiochemistry
  – solubility
  – specific gravity
  – spontaneous combustion
  – surface properties
  – adhesiveness
  – capillarity
  – surface tension
  – wettability
  – viscosity
  – volatilization
  – microchemistry

– electronics
  – amplifiers
  –  medical electronics
  – robotics
  – semiconductors
  – transistors
  – transducers
  –  pressure transducers

–  chemical evolution

–  planetary evolution

– geography
  – oceanography
  – geologic sediments
  –  medical topography

– geology
  – geologic sediments

– mathematics
  – algorithms
  – finite element analysis
  – fourier analysis
  – fractals
  – game theory
  –  experimental games
  – mathematical computing
  – decision support techniques
  –  statistical data interpretation
  – decision theory
  – decision trees
  – neural networks (computer)
  – nomograms
  – nonlinear dynamics
  – statistics
  – actuarial analysis
  – life tables
  – quality-adjusted life years
  – analysis of variance
  – multivariate analysis
  – biometry
  – cluster analysis
  – small-area analysis
  – space-time clustering
  – confidence intervals
  –  statistical data interpretation
  – discriminant analysis
  –  statistical factor analysis
  – matched-pair analysis
  – monte carlo method
  – principal component analysis
  – probability
  – bayes theorem
  – likelihood functions
  – markov chains
  – odds ratio
  – predictive value of tests
  – proportional hazards models
  – risk
  – logistic models
  – risk assessment
  – risk factors
  – uncertainty
  – regression analysis
  – least-squares analysis
  – linear models
  – logistic models
  – proportional hazards models
  – roc curve
  – sensitivity and specificity
  – statistical distributions
  – binomial distribution
  – chi-square distribution
  – normal distribution
  – poisson distribution
  –  nonparametric statistics
  – stochastic processes
  – markov chains
  – survival analysis
  – disease-free survival

– nanotechnology
  – nanomedicine

– nature

– physics
  – acoustics
  – psychoacoustics
  – sound
  – noise
  – ultrasonics
  – phonophoresis
  – sonication
  – biophysics
  – biomechanics
  – compressive strength
  – elasticity
  – compliance
  – friction
  – kinetics
  – lifting
  – pliability
  – shear strength
  –  mechanical stress
  – tensile strength
  – torque
  – vibration
  – weight-bearing
  – bionics
  – diffusion
  – energy transfer
  – linear energy transfer
  – filtration
  – ultrafiltration
  – hemofiltration
  – hemodiafiltration
  – hemorheology
  – membrane potentials
  – doppler effect
  – electricity
  – electric capacitance
  – electric conductivity
  – electric impedance
  – electric wiring
  – electrodes
  – electromagnetics
  – electromagnetic fields
  – electrostatics
  – power plants
  – gravitation
  –  altered gravity
  – hypergravity
  – hypogravity
  – weightlessness
  – hardness
  – hardness tests
  – health physics
  – lubrication
  – magnetics
  – electromagnetics
  – electromagnetic fields
  – mechanics
  – compressive strength
  – elasticity
  – compliance
  – friction
  – kinetics
  – lifting
  – pliability
  – shear strength
  –  mechanical stress
  – tensile strength
  – torque
  – vibration
  – weight-bearing
  – motion
  – acceleration
  – deceleration
  – coriolis force
  – rotation
  – nuclear physics
  – alpha particles
  – beta rays
  – elementary particle interactions
  – elementary particles
  – electrons
  – heavy ions
  – mesons
  – neutrons
  – fast neutrons
  – photons
  – protons
  – nuclear energy
  – nuclear fission
  – nuclear fusion
  – magnetic resonance spectroscopy
  – electron spin resonance spectroscopy
  –  biomolecular nuclear magnetic resonance
  – nuclear reactors
  – particle accelerators
  – cyclotrons
  – synchrotrons
  – quantum theory
  – radioactivity
  – radionuclide generators
  – optics
  – anisotropy
  – birefringence
  – fiber optics
  – light
  – color
  – darkness
  – glare
  – incandescence
  – lasers
  – luminescence
  – fluorescence
  – photons
  – microscopy
  – optical rotation
  – photography
  – holography
  – image enhancement
  – radiographic image enhancement
  –  digital subtraction angiography
  – radiography, dental, digital
  –  dual-energy scanned projection radiography
  –  x-ray computed tomography
  –  computed tomographic colonography
  –  spiral computed tomography
  –  emission-computed tomography
  – positron-emission tomography
  – photofluorography
  – photogrammetry
  – moire topography
  – photomicrography
  –  ocular refraction
  – refractometry
  – oscillometry
  – phase transition
  – porosity
  – pressure
  – decompression (physics)
  – explosive decompression
  – hydrostatic pressure
  – osmotic pressure
  – partial pressure
  – vacuum
  – psychophysics
  – psychoacoustics
  – signal detection (psychology)
  – radiation
  – electromagnetic fields
  –  ionizing radiation
  – alpha particles
  – background radiation
  – beta rays
  – cosmic radiation
  – gamma rays
  – x-rays
  –  nonionizing radiation
  – high-energy shock waves
  – infrared rays
  – light
  – color
  – darkness
  – glare
  – incandescence
  – lasers
  – luminescence
  – fluorescence
  – photons
  – radio waves
  – microwaves
  – ultraviolet rays
  – radiation tolerance
  – radiometry
  – radiation dosage
  –  radiation dose-response relationship
  – radiation monitoring
  – body burden
  – film dosimetry
  – thermoluminescent dosimetry
  – scintillation counting
  – whole-body counting
  –  gamma spectrometry
  –  radiation scattering
  –  raman spectrum analysis
  – rheology
  – hemorheology
  – laser-doppler flowmetry
  – microfluidics
  – pulsatile flow
  – temperature
  – cold
  – freezing
  – heat
  – transition temperature
  – thermal conductivity
  – thermodynamics
  – convection
  – entropy
  – heat

– science
  – algorithms
  – knowledge
  – methods
  –  theoretical models
  – fractals
  – fuzzy logic
  –  biological models
  –  animal disease models
  –  cardiovascular models
  –  genetic models
  –  immunological models
  –  neurological models
  – neurolinguistic programming
  –  chemical models
  –  educational models
  –  molecular models
  –  nursing models
  –  organizational models
  –  psychological models
  – neurolinguistic programming
  –  statistical models
  – likelihood functions
  – linear models
  – logistic models
  –  economic models
  –  econometric models
  – nomograms
  – proportional hazards models
  – nonlinear dynamics
  – natural history
  – research
  – behavioral research
  – biomedical research
  – animal experimentation
  – animal use alternatives
  – animal testing alternatives
  – embryo research
  – research embryo creation
  – fetal research
  – genetic research
  – human genome project
  – human experimentation
  – autoexperimentation
  – nontherapeutic human experimentation
  – therapeutic human experimentation
  – empirical research
  – observation
  – qualitative research
  – feasibility studies
  –  research peer review
  – pilot projects
  – reproducibility of results
  – research design
  – control groups
  – double-blind method
  – meta-analysis
  – patient selection
  – random allocation
  – sample size
  – research support
  – systems integration
  – systems theory
  – training support
  – fellowships and scholarships

– time
  – chronology
  – half-life
  – periodicity
  – seasons
  – photoperiod
  – time factors

– weights and measures
  – calibration
  – international system of units
  – metric system
  – reference standards
  – reference values

The list continues at List of MeSH codes (I01).

H01